is a retired Japanese weightlifter. He competed at the 1964 and 1968 Olympics in the middleweight class (-78 kg) and finished in fifth and tenth place, respectively.

References

1941 births
Living people
Olympic weightlifters of Japan
Weightlifters at the 1964 Summer Olympics
Weightlifters at the 1968 Summer Olympics
Japanese male weightlifters
20th-century Japanese people
21st-century Japanese people